The North Orange County Community College District (NOCCCD) is a community college district in Orange County, California that offers associate degrees and adult education certificates. It includes two colleges: Cypress College and Fullerton College.

Campuses
The District currently has three main campuses:

Cypress College
Located in Cypress, California, Cypress College offers over degrees in 73 areas of study, 56 university-transfer majors and 176 career-certificate programs. In the 2015–16 academic year, Cypress College, was home to over 16,000 students.

Fullerton College 
Located in Fullerton, California, Fullerton College offers over 90 associate degree programs and over 140 vocational certificate programs, as well as 25 associate degrees for transfer. In the 2016–17 academic year, Fullerton College, was home to over 34,000 students.

North Orange Continuing Education (NOCE)
Located in northern Orange County, California, the North Orange Continuing Education provides non-credit continuing adult education and community service classes at all three of its campus locations, as well as numerous off-campus locations. NOCE has locations in Anaheim, California, Cypress, California and Fullerton, California. Some of the classes NOCE offers include: GED/HiSET preparation, ESL, Educational Enrichment for Older Adults and even a variety of career certificates.

Governance and Leadership

Board of Trustees
The main governing body of the NOCCCD is the Board of Trustees. This body is composed of seven members, including two student trustees representing Cypress College and Fullerton College, and is charged with establishing all policies that guide the general operation of the District.

Working Groups
The NOCCCD has also created groups that provide recommendations in the decision-making process to the Chancellor. There is a total of three groups that serve as conduits of information to and from the constituents, allowing them to be more informed about the decision-making process. The three groups are as follow:

NOCCCD Foundation
Formed in 1987, the Community College Foundation of North Orange County (CCFONOC), or informally the NOCCCD Foundation, is a charitable organization whose goal is to assist in the achievement and maintenance of superior educational and community programs of the NOCCCD. The Foundation world to achieve this goal by receiving contributions from the public, raising funds, and making contributions to educational, community, and legislative programs.

Furthermore, the Foundation currently administers the endowments of two scholarship programs for students at Cypress College and Fullerton College: the Nilane Lee Memorial Scholarship and the Walt Pray Memorial Scholarship.

Notes

External links
 Official website

Universities and colleges in Orange County, California
California Community Colleges
Education in Orange County, California
Anaheim, California
Cypress, California
Fullerton, California
Educational institutions established in 1965
1965 establishments in California